Shan Zhongde (born January 1970) is a Chinese engineer and currently researcher and doctoral supervisor of China Academy of Machinery Science and Technology.

Biography
Shan was born in Gaomi, Shandong, in January 1970. He received his master's degree and doctor's degree from Xi'an University of Technology in 1993 and 1996, respectively. In 2002 he obtained his doctor's degree from Tsinghua University. Then he became a visiting scholar at Cardiff University. he was a postdoctoral fellow at Tsinghua University between 2003 and 2006.

In 2014 he was appointed vice-president of China Academy of Machinery Science and Technology. He has been deputy general manager of China Academy of Machinery Science and Technology Group Co., Ltd. since March 2018.

Honours and awards
 2015 National Science Fund for Distinguished Young Scholars
 2015 Technology Innovation Award of the Ho Leung Ho Lee Foundation 
 November 22, 2019 Member of the Chinese Academy of Engineering (CAE)

References

1970 births
Living people
People from Gaomi
Xi'an University of Technology alumni
Tsinghua University alumni
Engineers from Shandong
Members of the Chinese Academy of Engineering
Presidents of Nanjing University of Aeronautics and Astronautics